New York State Route 85A (NY 85A) is an east–west state highway in Albany County, New York, in the United States. While NY 85 bypasses the village of Voorheesville to the south, NY 85A directly serves it, connecting to two state routes inside of the village limits. The route was assigned  to its current alignment.

Route description

NY 85A begins at an intersection with NY 85 in the hamlet of New Salem, located in the northwestern portion of the town of New Scotland. It heads northward from the site of the Punkintown Fair as New Salem Road, leaving New Salem for slightly more open areas north of the hamlet. Development along the route remains high, however, as the two-lane road passes by several residential street and serves Clayton A. Bouton High School. Inside the village, NY 85A becomes known as Helderberg Parkway.

As it approaches the center of the village, NY 85A serves Voorheesville Elementary School and meets the eastern end of NY 156. While NY 156 heads northwest out of the village on Altamont Road, NY 85A continues east through Voorheesville's commercial and residential center on Maple Avenue. Along the way, the route passes by a village park and passes under the CSX Transportation-owned Selkirk Subdivision rail line. On the eastern fringe of the village, the route connects to the western terminus of NY 155 by way of a roundabout. Now under the name Maple Road, NY 85A heads southeast from the village, connecting to several housing tracts and passing by Colonie Country Club. Roughly  from NY 155, the highway turns due southward, traversing open fields to return to NY 85 at a junction east of the hamlet of New Scotland.

History
The entirety of modern NY 85A was taken over by the state of New York by 1926 and designated as NY 85A . East of Voorheesville, NY 85A was originally concurrent with NY 156 to NY 85, where both routes ended. The overlap between the two routes was eliminated when NY 156 was truncated to Voorheesville at some point between 1950 and 1965.

Major intersections

See also

References

External links

085A
Transportation in Albany County, New York